In mathematics, especially linear algebra, the exchange matrices (also called the reversal matrix, backward identity, or standard involutory permutation) are special cases of permutation matrices, where the 1 elements reside on the antidiagonal and all other elements are zero. In other words, they are 'row-reversed' or 'column-reversed' versions of the identity matrix.

Definition
If J is an n × n exchange matrix, then the elements of J are

Properties
 Exchange matrices are symmetric; that is, JnT = Jn.
 For any integer k, Jnk = I if k is even and Jnk = Jn if k is odd. In particular, Jn is an involutory matrix; that is, Jn−1 = Jn.
 The trace of Jn is 1 if n is odd and 0 if n is even. In other words, the trace of Jn equals .
 The determinant of Jn equals . As a function of n, it has period 4, giving 1, 1, −1, −1 when n is congruent modulo 4 to 0, 1, 2, and 3 respectively.
 The characteristic polynomial of Jn is  when n is even, and  when n is odd.

Relationships
 An exchange matrix is the simplest anti-diagonal matrix.
 Any matrix A satisfying the condition AJ = JA is said to be centrosymmetric.
 Any matrix A satisfying the condition AJ = JAT is said to be persymmetric.
 Symmetric matrices A that satisfy the condition AJ = JA are called bisymmetric matrices. Bisymmetric matrices are both centrosymmetric and persymmetric.

See also
 Pauli matrices (the first Pauli matrix is a 2 × 2 exchange matrix)

References

Matrices